Magdalena Mielcarz (born 3 March 1978) is a Polish actress, model and singer also known as Lvma Black.

Career
As a model, she appeared on numerous covers of magazines like Elle, Cosmopolitan, InStyle, Glamour and worked with designers like Valentino and Missoni. She was the first Polish woman to sign a contract with the cosmetic brand L'Oréal. Her acting career started in 2001 when she played a leading role in the Polish blockbuster movie Quo Vadis directed by an Oscar nominee Jerzy Kawalerowicz. She later acted in numerous films in Europe like Fanfan la Tulipe (2003), Strange Crime (2004), and Taras Bulba (2009). Mielcarz hosted Polish version of The Voice franchise in 2011 and 2014. She was named Glamour Poland's Woman of the Year in 2011.

In 2011, she launched her music career by releasing the single "Drown in Me". Since 2019, she is releasing her music as Lvma Black. Her 2019 single "I C U" charted in Poland at number 61.

Mielcarz holds a master's degree in Journalism and Political Science from the University of Warsaw, and is also a graduate of the Maggie Flanigan Drama Studio in New York. She currently lives in Los Angeles, with her husband and their two daughters.

Filmography

Discography

Single

Music video 
 2011: "Drown in Me"
 2014: "Silver Dream"
 2015: "Stormy Wave"
 2019: "I C U" (as Lvma Black)

Agencies

References

External links

http://www.fashionmodeldirectory.com/models/Magda_Mielcarz/
http://avantmodels.pl/

1978 births
Living people
Actresses from Warsaw
Polish female models
Polish film actresses
Polish television actresses
Polish child actresses
Polish stage actresses
University of Warsaw alumni
20th-century Polish actresses
21st-century Polish actresses
Models from Warsaw